Harpephyllum is a genus of trees in the family Anacardiaceae (the cashew and mango family). The sole species is Harpephyllum caffrum, a dioecious evergreen species from South Africa and Mozambique that is also cultivated. The fruit is edible.

References

External links
 
 Biodiversity Explorer
 PlantZAfrica.com

Fruits originating in Africa
Flora of Mozambique
Trees of South Africa
Dioecious plants
Monotypic Sapindales genera
Anacardiaceae
Anacardiaceae genera